Derin Ologbenla was the 45th Ooni of Ife, a paramount traditional ruler of Ile Ife, the ancestral home of the Yorubas. He succeeded Ooni Ooni Orarigba and was succeeded by Ooni Adelekan Olubuse I.

References

Oonis of Ife
Yoruba history
Fajemirokun family